Bernard Henry Cédric Doumbia (born November 11, 1992) is an Ivorian professional footballer who currently plays as a forward.

References

External links
https://int.soccerway.com/players/henri-doumbia/397115/
http://player.7mth.com/393696/index.shtml
 Bernard Doumbia Interview

1992 births
Ivorian footballers
Bernard Doumbia
Bernard Doumbia
Bernard Doumbia
Bernard Doumbia
Al-Arabi SC (Kuwait) players
Bernard Doumbia
Bernard Doumbia
Association football forwards
Living people
Expatriate footballers in Thailand
Expatriate footballers in Kuwait
Ivorian expatriate sportspeople in Thailand
Ivorian expatriate sportspeople in Kuwait
Kuwait Premier League players
Bernard Doumbia
Al-Fahaheel FC players
Qadsia SC players